South Africa's 2011–12 Premier Soccer League season (known as the ABSA Premiership for sponsorship reasons) was the sixteenth since its establishment. Orlando Pirates were the defending champions, having won their third PSL title, and in the process ended SuperSport United's 3 year grip on the championship. The season kicked off on 12 August 2011 and ended on 19 May 2012.

16 teams contested the season, including two newly promoted teams – yo-yo club Jomo Cosmos – who were promoted for the second time in 3 seasons after winning the 2010–11 National First Division champions' playoff 5–4 on penalties against Bay United, and Black Leopards who came through a four-way promotion playoff, defeating Bay United 2–0 over a two-legged final. Orlando Pirates secured the title with a 4–2 win against Golden Arrows on 19 May 2012. This was their fourth PSL title overall and the second in succession. At the bottom, Jomo Cosmos was automatically relegated to the First Division while Santos was relegated via the PSL Playoff Tournament.

TV rights
The PSL announced that current digital broadcaster SuperSport had won the rights to continue broadcasting the PSL after their current contract expired at the end of the 2011–12 season. The new broadcasting deal will commence at the start of the 2012–13 season and is said to be worth R2 billion over five years. As with their outgoing contract, SuperSport will continue to lease a select number of matches to free-to-air public broadcaster SABC.

Teams
The team finishing 16th and last during the 2010–11 PSL season – Mpumalanga Black Aces – was automatically relegated from the PSL while the team finishing 15th – Vasco da Gama – was entered into a four-way relegation/promotion playoff with 3 teams from the 2010–11 National First Division season, where they were comfortably beaten 4–2 on aggregate by Black Leopards in the semi-finals and thus relegated from the PSL. As it was, both Black Aces and Vasco had been promoted in the previous season, so they each spent a single season in the top flight before going straight back down.

Jomo Cosmos and Black Leopards had finished first and second in the Inland Stream of the 2010–11 National First Division season. Cosmos, as champions of the Inland Stream, faced off against the champions of the Coastal Stream – Bay United – and beat them 5–4 on penalties after two goalless draws, thus securing promotion to the PSL. In the next phase of the relegation/promotion playoffs Black Leopards had taken on and defeated Vasco da Gama of the PSL over two legs and proceeded to reach the final of the playoffs, where they met Bay United. Leopards continued Bay United's heartbreaking end to their season by defeating them over two legs to earn a return to the PSL after two seasons out of the top flight.

Stadiums and locations
Football teams in South Africa tend to use multiple stadiums over the course of a season for their home games. The following table will only indicate the stadium used most often by the club for their home games

Personnel and kits

Managerial changes

League table

Winner of the 2012 Nedbank Cup will qualify for the 2013 CAF Confederation Cup.

Results

Statistics
Top goalscorers
As of May 19, 2012

Last updated: 19 May 2012
Source: Premier Soccer League

Awards
The 2011–12 PSL Awards ceremony was held on 27 May 2012.

PSL Footballer of the Year
The PSL Footballer of the Year was awarded to Siyabonga Nomvethe.

Palesa Shabalala
The PSL Player of the Season was also awarded to Siyabonga Nomvethe.

PSL Players' Player of the Season
The PSL Players' Player of the Season was also awarded to Siyabonga Nomvethe.

PSL Red Hot Young Player of the Season
The PSL Red Hot Young Player of the Season was awarded to Ronwen Williams.

PSL Coach of the Season
The PSL Coach of the Season was awarded to Gordon Igesund.

PSL Top Goalscorer
The PSL Top Goalscorer award went to Siyabonga Nomvethe.

PSL Goalkeeper of the Season
The PSL Goalkeeper of the Season award went to Wayne Sandilands.

PSL Absa-lutely Awesome Goal of the Season
The PSL Absa-lutely Awesome Goal of the Season award went to Benni McCarthy.

See also
 CAF 5-Year Ranking

References

External links
Premier Soccer League (PSL) Official Website
ABSA Premiership
PSL Results
PSL Standings
SA Premiership 2011–2012 Season Domestic Stats

South
1
Premier Soccer League seasons